Diethyl sulfide (British English: diethyl sulphide) is an organosulfur compound with the chemical formula . It is a colorless, malodorous liquid.  Although a common thioether, it has few applications.

Preparation
Diethyl sulfide is a by-product of the commercial production of ethanethiol, which is prepared by the reaction of ethylene with hydrogen sulfide over an alumina-based catalyst.  The amount of diethyl sulfide produced can be controlled by varying the ratio of hydrogen sulfide to ethylene.

Occurrence

Diethyl sulfide has been found to be a constituent of the odor of durian fruit and as a constituent found in volatiles from potatoes.

Reactions
Diethyl sulfide is a Lewis base, classified as a soft ligand (see also ECW model).Its relative donor strength toward a series of acids, versus other Lewis bases, can be illustrated by C-B plots.    

With bromine, it forms the bromosulfonium salt:

A typical coordination complex is cis-PtCl2(SEt2)2.

References

Thioethers
Solvents
Foul-smelling chemicals